Seanad Éireann, the upper House of the Oireachtas, has been addressed on occasion by invited non-members.  Since 22 May 2001, the Seanad's standing orders allow its Committee on Procedure and Privilege (CPP) to approve the attendance of an Irish Member of the European Parliament (MEP) in the house. 
(Currently S.O.57; originally S.O.52A, and later S.O.56.) 
In July 2011, S.O.57 was extended to "representatives and persons in public and civic life".
Separately, the CPP can recommend inviting "Distinguished Persons" to address the house; since the late 1990s this has been extended, typically to EU officials.

Senators have also been present alongside TDs at joint sessions of the Seanad and Dáil Éireann, the lower house of the Oireachtas: see  list of addresses to the Oireachtas.

See also
 List of addresses to the Oireachtas, includes joint sessions and Dáil addresses at which Seanad members were present.

References

Addresses
Seanad Eireann
Addresses to Seanad Eireann